Alam Ara is a 1931 Indian Hindustani-language historical fantasy film directed and produced by Ardeshir Irani. It revolves on a king and his two wives, Navbahaar and Dilbahaar, who are childless; soon, a fakir (Muhammad Wazir Khan) tells the king that the former wife will give birth to a boy, later named Qamar (Master Vithal), but the child will die following his 18th birthday if Navbahaar cannot find the necklace he asks for. Meanwhile, the king finds out that Dilbahaar falls for the senapati Adil (Prithviraj Kapoor), leading the king to arrest him and evicts his pregnant wife, who later gives birth to Alam Ara (Zubeida).

Irani was inspired to make Alam Ara, after watching the 1929 American part-talkie Show Boat. The story was adapted from the Bombay-based dramatist Joseph David's play of the same name. Because the studio was located near a railway track, it was filmed mostly during the nighttime to avoid noise from the active trains. Following filming, Ardeshir Irani finished the sound recording using the single-system recording. Firozshah Mistry and B. Irani served as the music director.

Alam Ara was released on 14 March 1931 and performed well at the box office. Critics were appreciative, with the performance and songs got the most attention though some of whom criticised the sound recording. In addition to the successes, the film was also widely considered a major breakthrough for the Indian film industry and Ardeshir Irani's career with its status as the country's first sound film. Although no print or gramophone record of the film is known to survive, thereby making it a lost film, surviving artefacts include its stills and posters. In 2017, the British Film Institute declared it as the most important of any lost films produced in India.

Plot 
A king and his two wives, Navbahaar and Dilbahaar, are childless. Soon, a fakir tells Navbahaar she will give birth to a boy but she must find a necklace tied around a fish's neck—which will appear once at the lake of the palace—if she wants her son not to die on his 18th birthday. The boy is named Qamar. Beside that, Dilbahaar has an affair with the palace's senapati, Adil. The king finds out about this, and Dilbahaar tells him it was Adil who seduced her first. Therefore, the king arrests him and evicts his pregnant wife, Mehar Nigar, from the palace; Nigar gives birth to Alam Ara and dies when a shikari tells her about her husband. The shikari later adopts Ara.

Dilbahaar is jealous of Navbahaar and knows about her agreement with the fakir. When the necklace appears on Qamar's 18th birthday, she secretly replaces it with a fake one, which makes Qamar die. His family, however, does not bury his body and starts looking for the fakir to find what was wrong. As a result, Qamar lives again every night when Dilbahaar removes the necklace from her neck and later dies when she wears it in the morning. Apart from that, Ara knows about her innocent father's suffering, vowing to release him from jail. On her visits to the place one night, Ara sees the alive Qamar and falls for him. Everyone in the palace subsequently knows about Dilbahaar's foul play and finally gets the real necklace, with Adil being released. The film ends with Qamar and Alam Ara living happily together.

Cast 
 Master Vithal as Qamar
 Zubeida as Alam Ara
 Prithviraj Kapoor as Adil
 Muhammad Wazir Khan as a fakir (cameo appearance)

Other supporting roles were played by Jilloo, Sushila, Elizer, Jagdish Sethi, L. V. Prasad, and Yaqub.

Production 

After watching Harry A. Pollard's 1929 American romantic drama part-talkie Show Boat at Excelsior Theatre in Bombay (present-day Mumbai), Ardeshir Irani was inspired to make his next project a sound film which he would direct and produce. Although having no experience creating this type of film, he determined to make it and decided to not follow any precedential sound films. The project was subsequently titled Alam Ara and produced by Irani for Imperial Film Company (IFC), an entertainment studio he co-founded with the tent showman Abdulally Esoofally in 1926. The story was adapted from the Bombay-based dramatist Joseph David's Parsi play of the same name, while the screenplay was done by Irani. The dialogue was written in Hindustani, a mix of Hindi and Urdu.

Zubeida was cast in the title role after Irani's frequent collaborator and first choice, Ruby Myers, was unable to join the cast for her inability to speak the film's language. This left Myers disappointed and she took a one-year hiatus from acting, perfecting her ability to speak Hindustani. Irani initially wanted the debutant Mehboob Khan to be the male lead, but later changed his mind and wanted a "more commercially-viable" actor, an opportunity taken by Master Vithal—one of the most successful filmmakers of Indian silent cinema. In later years, Khan would admit that it left him unhappy. When Vithal decided to star in the film, he ended his ongoing contract with Saradhi Studios, at which he started his career, and it made him face legal issues as the studio believed he had a breach of contract. With help from his lawyer Muhammad Ali Jinnah, he won the case and moved to IFC to play the male lead of Alam Ara.

Alam Ara, which was funded by the business tycoon Seth Badriprasad Dube, cost . Principal photography was completed by Adi M. Irani at Jyoti Studios in Bombay within four months, using equipment that was bought from Bell & Howell. When being interviewed by Bhagwan Das Garga, Ardeshir Irani confessed that he kept the project a secret during its production. H. M. Reddy, Bharucha, Gidwani, and Pessi Kerani were the assistant directors. As the studio was located near a railway track, the film was shot mostly during the nighttime—between 1:00am and 4:00am—to avoid noise from the active trains, which according to Ardeshir Irani would pass every several minutes. Microphones were placed at concealed locations around the actors.

Irani and Rustom Bharucha, a lawyer and the manager of his other production company, Imperial Studios, worked as sound technicians for the film. Before the shooting started, they learned the basics of sound recording from American expert Wilford Deming. When Deming came to Mumbai to give them the sound machines, he charged , which Irani considered a large number at the time. Irani could not fulfill his demand and later finished it by himself and Bharucha. They used Tanar, a single-system recording by which sound is recorded at the same time of shooting. In 2012, the magazine Outlook reported that the cast and crew were pleased to be parts of the film and ready to receive lesser pays for their work.

Soundtrack 
The soundtrack to Alam Ara was released by Saregama, and has a total of seven songs: "De De Khuda Ke Naam Pe Pyaare", "Badla Dilwayega Yaar Ab Tu Sitamgaroon Se", "Rootha Hai Aasmaan", "Teri Kateelee Nigaahon Ne Mara", "De Dil Ko Aaram Aey Saaki Gulfaam", "Bhar Bhar Ke Jaam Pila Ja", and "Daras Bin Morey Hain Tarse Nayna Pyare". "De De Khuda Ke Naam Pe Pyaare", sung by Muhammad Wazir Khan, became popular at the time of its release and was acknowledged as the first song of Hindi cinema. Zubeida performed mostly the rest of the songs. The credit of the film, however, did not mention both the music director and lyricist. According to Ferozshah Mistri's son Kersi Mistri, all of the songs were composed by his father; in contrast, the film's booklets mentioned B. Irani as the composer. Ardeshir Irani said that he did not know who the music directors are, adding that he had only a pump organ and tabla player. Furthermore, he confessed that the lyrical composition was done by himself.

Release and reception 

Distributed by Sagar Movietone, Alam Ara premiered at Majestic Cinema, Bombay on 14 March 1931, and the screenings ran for eight weeks. Ramesh Roy, an office boy of IFC, brought the film's reel to the theatre. When Mayank Shekhar of the Hindustan Times interviewed him in 2006, he recalled it as "a moment in history, when the public coming out of the show wouldn't stop talking about the film they'd seen, that also talked!" According to Daily Bhaskar, crowds of people would stand in line from 9:00am although the first show occurred at 3:00pm. As a solution, police were assigned to the theatre and allowed to use sticks to control the crowds and traffic. Sharmistha Gooptu, in her article published in The Times of India, reported: "[Alam Ara] is proving to a great attraction at the Majestic Cinema, and crowded houses have been the order of the day." It was also the first film to be screened at Imperial Cinema in Paharganj.

The film clashed with Shirin Farhad, a J.J. Madan-directed musical film that was released around two months later. Exact figures for the box-office earnings of Alam Ara are not available, but many historians believed that the film performed well. According to the Encyclopaedia of Hindi Cinema in 2003, the film was more successful than Shirin Farhad; a 2006 report from The Hindu stated that it became an "instant hit". Similar thoughts were given by Roy Armes, in his book titled Third World Film Making and the West (1987), calling the film "an enormous popular success". In 2012, the writer of Outlook observed that the film's commercial performance "dealt a body blow to the careers of the reining stars of [silent] cinema", including Vithal especially since he was not fluent in Hindustani language.

Critics were generally positive of Alam Ara, praising the performance of the cast but some of whom criticising the sound recording; they have noted that it has "shared many of the common defects of Indian productions" and ended a trend where the previous Indian films always promoting social values in their plot. On 2 April 1931, The Bombay Chronicle took note of Irani's "thoughtful" direction and applauded the performances from Vithal, Zubeida and Kapoor, which the reviewer thought had evolved dramatic values that silent films could not do. In the magazine's June 1932 issue, American Cinematographer gave a scathing review, saying that "[t]hroughout, the blindest groping for fundamental facts was evident"; the reviewer wrote that the laboratory processing and sound recording were the biggest issues of the film. A writer of The Times of India observed how the actors lacked experience in talking near microphones, which made them sound like they were screaming. Indian Talkie (a magazine published by the Film Federation of India from 1931 to 1956) called the film "the birth cry of the talkie".

Legacy 

Alam Ara is widely regarded as the first sound film of India. It has been described as the rise of the Indian cinema of the early 1930s, and in its 2013 report, The Times of India added, "... edging out the advantage enjoyed by imported films in the silent era, when the largest share of the Indian market was taken by American films ... this transition also made for the rise of a host of new operators, who would become the industry’s vanguard in the first talkie era." The author of Indian Film Music (1991), Nasreen Munni Kabir, said she believed that it has made later films produced in the country more dependent on songs "in a way that has differentiated Indian cinema from most world cinema". Writing for The Rough Guide to World Music (1999), Mark Ellingham reported that the film's success has influenced India, Sri Lanka, and Myanmar. In 2003, the scholar Shoma Chatterji hailed, "With the release of Alam Ara, Indian cinema prove two things—that films could now be made in a regional language that the local viewers could understand; and that songs and music [were] integral part[s] of the entire form and structure of the Indian film."

The film is also considered as a turning point of Ardeshir Irani's career and gave him a reputation as the "father of Indian talkies". Impressed by it, producer Birendranath Sircar acquired the recording equipment of the film and contacted Deming to work with him in Calcutta (present-day Kolkata). Irani used the sets of the film to shoot his next production venture, titled Kalidas, which would become the first Indian multilingual film following its release in 1931. Alam Ara is listed in "40 Firsts in Indian Cinema" by NDTV in 2013, "100 Filmfare Days" by Filmfare in 2014, and "70 Iconic Films of Indian Cinema" by Mint in 2017. In 2011, Google made a doodle to celebrate its 80th release anniversary, featuring Vithal and Zubeida. Writer Renu Saran features the film in the book 101 Hit Films of Indian Cinema (2014). In the same year, a 2015 calendar titled "The Beginnings of Indian Cinema" was released, featuring the poster of its. The film has been remade at least four times: by Chitrapu Narayana Rao in Telugu in 1942 and 1967, and by Nanubhai Vakil in Hindi in 1956 and 1973.

No print of Alam Ara is known to have survived, but several stills and posters are available. According to an article published by The Indian Express, several publications and the film's entry on Wikipedia had mistakenly stated that the film's last print was destroyed by a fire at the National Film Archive of India in 2003. Its founder, P. K. Nair, declined the reports, clarifying in 2011 that it has been lost before the archive itself was established in 1964. He added the fire only destroyed mostly the nitrate negatives of Prabhat Film Company, and confirmed that he had received several photographs of the film from Irani and his son Shapoorji. Nair estimated that 70 percent of pre-1950 Indian films are lost. In 2017, the British Film Institute's Shruti Narayanswamy declared Alam Ara as the most important lost film of India.

See also 

 List of lost films
 List of Hindi films of 1931

References

Sources 

 
 
 
 
 
 
 
 
 
 
 
 
 
 
 
 
 
 
 
 
 
 
  Alt URL

External links 

 

1930s Hindi-language films
1930s romantic fantasy films
1931 films
1931 lost films
Films directed by Ardeshir Irani
Indian black-and-white films
Indian epic films
Indian romantic fantasy films
Lost Indian films
Urdu-language Indian films
1930s Urdu-language films